Ablanitsa is a village in Lovech Municipality, Lovech Province, in the north-western region of Bulgaria, situated right at the foot of the mountain Stara Planina and is home to Saint Demetrius Orthodox Church,  as well as an abundance of caves.

References

Villages in Lovech Province